The eleventh season of Calle 7 began on November 5, 2012, new contestants were introduced as some former participants left the show.

Contestants

Teams competition

Elimination order

2012 Chilean television seasons
2013 Chilean television seasons